Der Tunnel is a novel by Bernhard Kellermann published in April 1913. The novel sold 100,000 copies in the six months after its publication, and it became one of the most successful books of the first half of the 20th century. By 1939 its circulation had reached millions. The main theme of the novel is social progress, particularly with respect to modern technology.

Plot 
Allan, an idealistic engineer, wants to build a tunnel at the bottom of the Atlantic Ocean connecting North America with Europe within a few years. The idealist's scheme is thwarted for financial reasons, and the tunnel construction (in particular a segment dug under a mountain) experiences several disasters. A fiasco seems inevitable, the army of workers revolt, and Allan becomes a figure of universal hatred throughout the world. After 26 years of construction, the tunnel is finally completed; however, the engineering masterpiece is outdated as soon as it opens, as aeroplanes now cross the Atlantic in a few hours.

Reception 
The reception of the book and its sentiments was extremely positive, and was on its publication a success for Kellerman. The story anticipated important social events as the Great Depression, and had the charm of a parallel world history of a 1920s and 1930s in which the First World War never occurred. It also made the critical observation that technology always becomes outdated with its application.

Controversy 
A controversial aspect of the book was its thinly-veiled racist overtones in the character of S. Woolf, Allan's nemesis. Woolf is a financial magnate who emigrated from Eastern Europe, and was portrayed as immoral and perverted. These were common Jewish stereotypes at the time Kellerman wrote.

Film adaptations 

Four films have been based on the book. The first was The Tunnel in 1915, a silent film directed by William Wauer. Three films were released in 1933 and 1935, one version each in German (Der Tunnel), French (Le Tunnel) and English (The Tunnel, renamed Transatlantic Tunnel in the US). The French and German versions were directed by Curtis Bernhardt and the English by Maurice Elvey. At the time it was not unusual to release a film in separate versions in different languages, each using different actors or directors, but utilising the same sets and locations.

See also

Transatlantic tunnel

References
 

1913 German-language novels
German science fiction novels
1913 science fiction novels
German alternate history novels
Novels set in the Atlantic Ocean
German novels adapted into films
1913 German novels